Niral Enem Horo  (1925–2008)  was an Indian politician and a former member of the Lok Sabha. He represented Khunti in 4th and 5th Lok Sabha. He was associated with the Jharkhand Party and served as a minister in the government of Bihar. He was the losing candidate for Vice President of India in the 1974 election.

Early life 

Horo was born on March 31, 1925, to Abraham Horo at Govindpur village, Ranchi district. He began his education at Zila School, Ranchi. He earned a B.A. from St. Columba's College, Hazaribagh and a B.L. from Chotanagpur Law College in Ranchi. He married Lilian Alice Horo on March 15, 1951. The couple had five sons.

Political career 

Horo was associated with the Jharkhand Party from the beginning of his public life. He was minister of Education, Planning, and Public Relations in the government of Bihar from 1968 to 1969. He was a member of the Bihar Legislative Assembly from 1967 to 1970 and from 1977 to 1980. He was a member of the Lok Sabha in 1970 and from 1971 to 1976. Horo became the president of the Jharkhand Party in 1971.

References

1925 births
2008 deaths
India MPs 1971–1977
Lok Sabha members from Bihar
India MPs 1967–1970
Indian vice-presidential candidates
India MPs 1980–1984
Jharkhand Party politicians